The  salt print was the dominant paper-based photographic process for producing positive prints (from negatives) from 1839 until approximately 1860.

The salted paper technique was created in the mid-1830s by English scientist and inventor Henry Fox Talbot. He made what he called "sensitive paper" for "photogenic drawing" by wetting a sheet of writing paper with a weak solution of ordinary table salt (sodium chloride), blotting and drying it, then brushing one side with a strong solution of silver nitrate. This produced a tenacious coating of silver chloride an especially light-sensitive chemical condition. The paper darkened where it was exposed to light. When the darkening was judged to be sufficient, the exposure was ended and the result was stabilized by applying a strong solution of salt, which altered the chemical balance and made the paper only slightly sensitive to additional exposure. In 1839, washing with a solution of sodium thiosulfate ("hypo") was found to be the most effective way to make the results truly light-fast.

The salt print process is often confused with Talbot's slightly later 1841 calotype or "talbotype" process, in part because salt printing was mostly used for making prints from calotype paper negatives rather than live subjects. Calotype paper employed silver iodide instead of silver chloride. Calotype was a developing out process, not a printing out process like the salt print. The most important functional difference is that it allowed a much shorter exposure to produce an invisible latent image which was then chemically developed to visibility. This made calotype paper far more practical for use in a camera. Salted paper typically required at least an hour of exposure in the camera to yield a negative showing much more than objects silhouetted against the sky. Gold toning of the salted paper print was a popular technique to make it much more permanent.

References

Sources
 Taylor, Roger. Impressed by Light: British Photographs from Paper Negatives, 1840-1860 (NY, Metropolitan Museum of Art, 2007)

See also

 Article about an exhibition of over 100 salt prints, with video of several examples.

External links

 How to Make a Salt Print
(Wayback Machine copy)
 Salted Paper Printing Process
 Salt Prints
 William Henry Fox Talbot (1800-1877) and the Invention of Photography
 Luminous Lint

Alternative photographic processes
Photographic processes dating from the 19th century